The 1970–71 season is Real Madrid Club de Fútbol's 68th season in existence and the club's 39th consecutive season in the top flight of Spanish football.

Summary
The club finished in a disappointing fourth place, two points below of Champion Valencia CF coached by former Real Madrid' star Alfredo Di Stéfano.

In 1971 Copa del Generalísimo the squad as Defending Champion was early eliminated in Round of 32 by Deportivo La Coruña on away goals.

The team played the 7th final in Europe, a record at the time, first a draw 1–1 after extra time, and then, lost the 1971 European Cup Winners' Cup Final trophy against Chelsea F.C. 1–2 in the replay in Piraeus closing the first trophy-less season since the 1952–53 campaign. After 18 years as club player, clinching 12 league titles, 2 Copa del Generalísimo and 6 European Cups Francisco Gento is retired at the end of this season.

Squad

Transfers

Competitions

La Liga

Position by round

League table

Matches

Copa del Generalísimo

Round of 32

European Cup Winners' Cup

Final

Statistics

Players statistics

References

External links
 BDFútbol

Real Madrid CF seasons
Real Madrid